Elizabeth Paschel Hoisington (November 3, 1918 – August 21, 2007) was a United States Army officer who was one of the first two women to attain the rank of brigadier general.

Early life
Born in Newton, Kansas, on November 3, 1918, Elizabeth Hoisington was a 1940 graduate of the College of Notre Dame of Maryland.

Military career
During World War II the United States Army expanded opportunities for women beyond nursing by creating the Women's Army Auxiliary Corps (WAAC). Hoisington enlisted in the WAACs in November 1942 and completed her basic training at Fort Des Moines, Iowa. At the time, women were required to serve in units before they could apply to Officer Candidate School (OCS), so Private Hoisington went to a WAAC aircraft early warning unit in Bangor, Maine. The company commander recognized her talents and made her the first sergeant soon after her arrival. She later said that she then sought out the most grizzled male first sergeant she could find and asked him to teach her what she needed to know. She said that he did such a good job that when she reached OCS she never had to open a book.

Hoisington was commissioned in May 1943 as a WAAC third officer. When the auxiliary became the Women's Army Corps (WAC) a month later, its officers changed to standard army ranks, and Hoisington became a second lieutenant. She deployed to Europe, serving in France after D-Day. Hoisington continued her career after World War II and advanced through the ranks to colonel as she commanded WAC units in Japan, Germany, and France and served in staff assignments in San Francisco and at the Pentagon.

Hoisington was appointed the seventh director of the Women's Army Corps on August 1, 1965, and served from 1966 to 1971. As director during the Vietnam War she visited WACs serving in Saigon and Long Binh in September, 1967. According to some sources, Hoisington discouraged sending army women to Vietnam because she believed the controversy would deter progress in expanding the overall role of women in the army.

On May 15, 1970, President Nixon announced the first women selected for promotion to brigadier general: Anna Mae Hays, Chief of the Army Nurse Corps, and Hoisington. The two women were promoted on June 11. Hays and Hoisington were promoted within minutes of each other. Because they were promoted in alphabetical order, Hays was the first woman in the United States Armed Forces to wear the insignia of a brigadier general. The Hoisington and Hays promotions resulted in positive public relations for the army, including appearances on the Dick Cavett, David Frost and Today shows. Hoisington, who was noted for her quick smile and ebullient personality, also appeared as a mystery guest on the popular game show ''What's My Line?

Hoisington retired from the army on August 1, 1971.

Family
Hoisington's grandfather, Colonel Perry Milo Hoisington I, helped to organize the Kansas National Guard. Her father, Gregory Hoisington, was a graduate of West Point and a colonel in the army. He was a direct descendant of Ebenezer Hoisington, a founder of the state of Vermont and a soldier in the American Revolution.

Hoisington's brother, Perry Hoisington II, was a United States Air Force general. Elizabeth Hoisington's 1970 promotion made them the first brother and sister generals in the United States military.

Death and burial
Hoisington died in Springfield, Virginia, on August 21, 2007, at the age of 88. She is buried at Arlington National Cemetery. She was survived by a younger brother, Robert (d. 2020), and a sister, Nancy (d. 2012).

Decorations

See also
 List of female United States military generals and flag officers

References

External links
"Marching on – Three Generations of Army Women" by Lt. Col. Randy Pullen
"Brigadier General Anna Mae Hays: 13th Chief, Army Nurse Corps" by Mary T. Sarnecky
 History of Army Women: Significant Dates (1966–1975)
Timeline Dates for Women in the Military Officially
"The Women's Army Corps during the Vietnam War" by Colonel Bettie J. Morden, U.S. Army Retired
Women in the United States Military History: In Vietnam
Washington Post obituary – source: The American Family Hoisington, by Harry Hoisington, 1934
Museum of Kansas National Guard Hall of Fame: Col. Perry M. Hoisington (her father)
Women in the U.S. Army

1918 births
2007 deaths
People from Newton, Kansas
Notre Dame of Maryland University alumni
Female generals of the United States Army
Women's Army Corps soldiers
United States Army personnel of World War II
United States Army personnel of the Korean War
United States Army personnel of the Vietnam War 
American female military personnel of the Vietnam War
Recipients of the Distinguished Service Medal (US Army)
Recipients of the Legion of Merit
Burials at Arlington National Cemetery
Women in warfare post-1945
21st-century American women